Karin Tabke is an American author.  Born in Miami, Florida, United States she now lives in Northern California.

Biography
Tabke has written two series Hot Cops and Blood Sword Legacy.

She has been the president of SFARWA San Francisco Area Romance Writers of America for two years.

Selected works

Novels
 Good Girl Gone Bad – Pocket Books – 2006 - 
 Skin – Pocket Books – 2007 – 
 Jaded – Pocket Books – 2008 - 
 Master of Surrender – Pocket Books – 2008 – 
 Have Yourself a Naughty Little Santa - Pocket Books – 2008 – 
 Master of Torment – Pocket Books – 2008 – 
 Master of Craving - Pocket Books - 2009 -

Anthologies
 The Hard Stuff with Bonnie Edwards and Sunny – Kensington Books – 2006 – 
 What You Can’t See with Allison Brennan and Roxanne St. Claire - Pocket Books – 2007 – 
 Italian Stallions with Jami Alden – Kensington Books – 2008 –

By series

Hot Cops series
 Good Girl Gone Bad
 Skin
 Jaded

Blood Sword Legacy series
 Master of Surrender
 Master of Torment
 Master of Craving

References

External links
 Karin Tabke Official Website
 Karin Tabke at Simon & Schuster, Inc.
 Fog City Divas
 Murder She Writes
 Write Attitude
 Writer Unboxed Interview
 Love Romances More Interview
 My Tote Bag Interview
 Antioch Press Interview
 Cosmopolitan Red Hot Reads
 San Francisco Area Romance Writers of America
 

21st-century American novelists
American women novelists
American romantic fiction writers
American fantasy writers
Writers from Miami
Living people
Women science fiction and fantasy writers
Women romantic fiction writers
21st-century American women writers
Novelists from Florida
Year of birth missing (living people)